Birtley can refer to several villages in England:

Birtley, Herefordshire
Birtley, Northumberland
Birtley, Shropshire
Birtley, Tyne and Wear
Birtley Green, Surrey

See also 
Bartley
Birtle (disambiguation)
Birtles (disambiguation)
Burtle